West Hollywood may refer to:

West Hollywood, California; a city in Los Angeles County, California   
West Hollywood, Hollywood, Florida; a neighborhood within the city limits of Hollywood, Florida